Edwin F. Ganz (June 13, 1859 – January 20, 1946) was an American farmer, teacher, newspaper editor, and politician.

Born in the Town of Waumandee, Buffalo County, Wisconsin, Ganz was educated in the public schools and at Platteville Normal School (now University of Wisconsin–Platteville). He taught school for fourteen years and then purchased the Buffalo County Journal in 1890. He was postmaster of Alma, Wisconsin and served on the Buffalo County Board of Supervisors. Ganz also served on the Alma Common Council and the school board. Ganz was elected to the Wisconsin State Assembly in 1918 and was involved with the Republican Party In Buffalo County. Ganz retired to a farm where he raised cattle. He died in a hospital in Wabasha, Minnesota.

Notes

External links

1859 births
1946 deaths
People from Buffalo County, Wisconsin
University of Wisconsin–Platteville alumni
Educators from Wisconsin
Editors of Wisconsin newspapers
Wisconsin city council members
School board members in Wisconsin
County supervisors in Wisconsin
Wisconsin postmasters
People from Alma, Wisconsin
Republican Party members of the Wisconsin State Assembly